Introducing Cadallaca is the only studio album by punk rock band Cadallaca, released on September 29, 1998 on K Records.

Music and lyrics
All of the ten songs on Introducing Cadallaca feature a Farfisa organ. According to Cadallaca's members, it was easy for them to write the songs on the album.

Critical reception

Stephanie Zacharek named Introducing Cadallaca her third favorite album of 1998.

Track listing
Your One Wish –	3:21
June -N- July –	3:12
You're My Only One –	2:41
Pocket Games –	4:28
Night Vandals –	4:38
Two Beers Later –	3:09
O Chenilla –	3:34
Cadallaca Theme –	2:32
Firetrap –	3:16
Winter Storm '98 –	3:20

Personnel
Neilson Abeel –	photography
Pat Castaldo –	design
Lawrence Crane – engineer
John Golden –	mastering
Calvin Johnson –	liner notes, producer
Corin Tucker –	guitar, voices

References

1998 debut albums
K Records albums